The 2017–18 LNAH season was the 22nd season of the Ligue Nord-Américaine de Hockey (before 2004 the Quebec Semi-Pro Hockey League), a minor professional league in the Canadian province of Quebec. Six teams participated in the regular season, which was won by the Sorel-Tracy Eperviers. Sorel-Tracy Eperviers also won the playoff championship.

Regular season

Coupe Canam-Playoffs 
All six teams qualify for the playoffs.  The two highest seeded quarterfinal losers advances to a repechage (2nd chance round) which is best-of-three.  The winner of that series advances to the semifinals.  All other rounds are best-of-seven.

Quarterfinals
Sorel-Tracy Éperviers defeated Trois-Rivières Draveurs 4 games to 2
Jonquière Marquis defeated Saint Georges Cool FM 103.5 4 games to 2
Rivière-du-Loup 3L defeated Thetford Mines Assurancia 4 games to 3

Repechage
Thetford Mines Assurancia defeated Saint Georges Cool FM 103.5 2 games to 1

Semifinals
Sorel-Tracy Éperviers defeated Thetford Mines Assurancia 4 games to 3
Rivière-du-Loup 3L defeated Jonquière Marquis 4 games to 2

Final
Sorel-Tracy Éperviers defeated Rivière-du-Loup 3L 4 games to 2

External links
 LNAH Official Website

References
 EliteProspects
 LNAH Official Website

Ligue Nord-Américaine de Hockey seasons
3